Niels van der Steen (born 31 January 1972) is a cyclist from the Netherlands. He competed in the men's team pursuit at the 1992 Summer Olympics with team mates Servais Knaven, Gerben Broeren & Erik Cent, finishing 12th.

See also
 List of Dutch Olympic cyclists

References

1972 births
Living people
Dutch male cyclists
Olympic cyclists of the Netherlands
Cyclists at the 1992 Summer Olympics
Sportspeople from Amersfoort
Cyclists from Utrecht (province)